Michael Adetokunbo Ojo (born June 28, 1989) is a Nigerian-American professional basketball player. He played college basketball for the Lehigh Mountain Hawks before playing pro ball in Europe.

Professional career 
In 2011, Ojo signed with the Plymouth Raiders of the British Basketball League and played there for two seasons. He helped the team make it to the BBL Cup and Trophy finals and in his final season, he averaged 22.5 points per game.

Later, Ojo played for Apollon Limassol (Cyprus),  Eco Örebro (Sweden), Apollon Patras (Greece), Sigma Barcellona (Italy) and mmcité Brno (Czech Republic). Also played in Austria for the Klosterneuburg Dukes and the Allianz Swans Gmunden.

On January 3, 2018, Ojo signed for the Worcester Wolves. In 21 games, he averaged 11.9 points and 3.0 assists while shooting 41.7% from the three point line. He helped the club to the BBL Cup Final on January 28, 2018, where he scored a team-high 18 points in the Wolves 88–99 loss to the Cheshire Phoenix.

On January 25, 2019, Ojo signed with Tindastóll of the Icelandic Úrvalsdeild karla. He appeared in 3 games for the team, averaging 11.7 points per game, before being released on 8 February.

On 3 March 2019, Ojo signed with BPC Virtus Cassino of the Italian Serie A2.

Nigerian national team 
In February 2018, Ojo was invited by the senior national team head coach Alexander Nwora to represent Nigeria in the 2019 World Cup qualifications. He made his debut for the senior national team on 24 February 2018, in a game against Rwanda.

References

External links 
Player Profile at eurobasket.com
Player Profile at realgm.com
Úrvalsdeild statistics at kki.is

1989 births
Living people
African-American basketball players
American sportspeople of Nigerian descent
American expatriate basketball people in Austria
American expatriate basketball people in Cyprus
American expatriate basketball people in the Czech Republic
American expatriate basketball people in Greece
American expatriate basketball people in Iceland
American expatriate basketball people in Italy
American expatriate basketball people in Sweden
American men's basketball players
Apollon Limassol BC players
Apollon Patras B.C. players
Basketball players from Santa Monica, California
Crossroads School alumni
Lehigh Mountain Hawks men's basketball players
Plymouth Raiders players
Point guards
Nigerian men's basketball players
Shooting guards
Swans Gmunden players
Ungmennafélagið Tindastóll men's basketball players
Úrvalsdeild karla (basketball) players
Xion Dukes Klosterneuburg players
Worcester Wolves players
21st-century African-American sportspeople
20th-century African-American people
American expatriate sportspeople in England
Nigerian expatriate sportspeople in England
Nigerian expatriate basketball people in Iceland
Nigerian expatriate basketball people in Cyprus
Nigerian expatriate basketball people in Greece
Nigerian expatriate basketball people in the Czech Republic
Nigerian expatriate basketball people in Austria
Nigerian expatriate basketball people in Sweden
Nigerian expatriate basketball people in Italy